Gasterocomacea is an extinct super family of crinoids from the Middle to Late Devonian.

References

External links 
Gasterocomacea in the Paleobiology Database

Cladida
Animal superfamilies
Devonian crinoids
Middle Devonian first appearances
Late Devonian animals
Late Devonian genus extinctions
Paleozoic echinoderms of Asia